The 1985 Pepsi Canadian Junior Men's Curling Championship was held February 17-24 in St. John's, Newfoundland. Team Alberta, skipped by 2010 Olympic champion skip Kevin Martin won the event, defeating Prince Edward Island (skipped by Kent Scales) in the finals. It was the first major championship win for Martin, one of the most decorated curlers in history. His win earned Martin a spot as the alternate for Canada at the 1985 World Junior Curling Championships, and his team (which also included Mike Berger, Dan Petryk and Rick Feeny) a spot representing Canada at the 1986 World Junior Curling Championships, where they would win a silver medal. 

Martin was a petroleum technologies student at the Northern Alberta Institute of Technology at the time.

Round-robin standings

Playoffs

Semifinal

Final

References

Ottawa Citizen, February 18, 1985, pg B5
Ottawa Citizen, February 23, 1985
Ottawa Citizen, February 25, 1985, pg B4

Canadian Junior Curling Championships
Curling in Newfoundland and Labrador
Sport in St. John's, Newfoundland and Labrador
Canadian Junior Curling Championships
Canadian Junior Men's Curling Championship
Junior Men's Curling Championship